Darby Walker (born August 5, 1974) is a Canadian former professional ice hockey player.

Walker played three seasons (1991-1994) of major junior hockey in the Western Hockey League (WHL).

Walker went on to play professional hockey, starting with 12 games played in the Central Hockey League (CHL) with the Fayetteville Force during the 1997–98. He then played three seasons in the British Ice Hockey Superleague (BISL) with the Newcastle Riverkings and the London Knights, where he scored 7 goals and 11 assist1 for 18 points, while earning 151 penalty minutes, in 79 BISL games played. Walker concluded his career with the 2001–02 San Antonio Iguanas of the CHL.

References

1974 births
Living people
Canadian ice hockey forwards
Fayetteville Force players
London Knights (UK) players
Medicine Hat Tigers players
Newcastle Riverkings players
Red Deer Rebels players
Regina Pats players
San Antonio Iguanas players
People from the County of Grande Prairie No. 1
Ice hockey people from Alberta
Canadian expatriate ice hockey players in England
Canadian expatriate ice hockey players in the United States